"Ran Off On Da Plug Twice" (originally titled "Ritz Carlton") is a song by American hip hop recording artist Plies. It was released on January 29, 2016 by Big Gates Records, Slip-n-Slide Records and Atlantic Records, as a single from his mixtape Ain't No Mixtape Bih 2. This song was produced by DTSpacely.

Music video
The song's accompanying music video originally premiered on November 19, 2015 on WorldStarHipHop's YouTube account and then moved to Plies's YouTube account with the name changed from Ritz Carlton to Ran Off on da Plug Twice due to the music video's viral popularity.

Charts

References

External links

2015 songs
2016 singles
Plies (rapper) songs
Songs written by Plies (rapper)
Atlantic Records singles